Trains is a mural in the Short North and Italian Village neighborhoods in Columbus, Ohio.

History 
Created by Jeff and Gregory Ackers in 1989, it covers the south wall of Bernard's Tavern and depicts passengers (some who are British royalty) on a train arriving in Columbus' Union Station.

It was across a parking lot of another Ackers-created mural, Union Station. The mural was considered to be in good shape in 2012. Around 2014, the hotel Le Méridien Columbus, The Joseph was built on the space that served as a parking lot and both murals can no longer be seen.

Gallery

References

External links

 
 WOSU feature on the mural and its counterpart

Murals in Columbus, Ohio
Trains in art
Italian Village